Lokhaniemi (Lihaniemi before 1948) is a peninsula along the eastern shore of Vyborg Bay (in the Gulf of Finland of the Baltic Sea), at its narrowest point, between Tikhaya Bay and Medyanskaya Bay.

External links
Modern Map
Old Finnish Map
Pictures of Lokhaniemi

Karelian Isthmus
Landforms of Leningrad Oblast
Peninsulas of Russia